Raymond Kaye (February 16, 1912 – July 17, 1983) was an American competition swimmer who represented the United States at the 1936 Summer Olympics in Berlin, Germany.  Kaye competed in the semifinals of the men's 200-meter breaststroke, recording a time of 2:49.2.

References

External links
 

1912 births
1983 deaths
American male breaststroke swimmers
Olympic swimmers of the United States
Swimmers from Detroit
Swimmers at the 1936 Summer Olympics